Munidopsis tafrii is a species of squat lobster first found in Taiwanese waters at depths greater than . It resembles M. ceratophthalma, however its carapace morphology distinguishes it from its cogenerate species.

References

Further reading
Osawa, Masayuki, Chia-Wei Lin, and Tim-Yam Chan. "Species of Galacantha and Munidopsis (Crustacea: Decapoda: Anomura: Galatheidae) from the deep-waters off Taiwan, with the description of two new species." Scientia Marina72.1 (2008): 37-57.
Macpherson, Enrique. Species of the genus Munidopsis Whiteaves, 1784 from the Indian and Pacific Oceans and reestablishment of the genus Galacantha A. Milne-Edwards, 1880 (Crustacea, Decapoda, Galatheidae). Magnolia Press, 2007.
Osawa, Masayuki, Chia-Wei Lin, and Tin-Yam Chan. "Additional records of Chirostylus and Munidopsis (Crustacea: Decapoda: Galatheoidea) from Taiwan." The Raffles Bulletin of Zoology, Supplement 19 (2008): 91-98.

External links

WORMS

Squat lobsters
Crustaceans described in 2006